Zuni National Forest was established by the U.S. Forest Service in Arizona and New Mexico on March 2, 1909 with  from parts of the Zuni and Navajo and other tribal lands. On September 10, 1914 Zuni was transferred to Manzano National Forest.  The lands are now part of the Cibola National Forest.

The Zuni Forest is part of the Mount Taylor Ranger District of Cibola National Forest, in the Zuni Mountains to the west of Grants in Cibola and McKinley Counties. The forest is bordered on the south by El Malpais National Monument.

References

External links
 Cibola National Forest, Mount Taylor Ranger District
 Forest History Society
 Forest History Society:Listing of the National Forests of the United States Text from Davis, Richard C., ed. Encyclopedia of American Forest and Conservation History. New York: Macmillan Publishing Company for the Forest History Society, 1983. Vol. II, pp. 743–788.

Former National Forests of Arizona
Former National Forests of New Mexico
Protected areas of Cibola County, New Mexico
Protected areas of McKinley County, New Mexico
Cibola National Forest